Rosanna Norton (born October 1, 1944) is a costume designer who was nominated, along with Elois Jenssen, for Best Costumes during the 55th Academy Awards for her work on Tron. She is also known for her work on the live action version of The Flintstones.

Selected filmography

A Very Brady Sequel (1996)
The Brady Bunch Movie (1995)
Casper (1995)
Operation Dumbo Drop (1995)
Angels in the Outfield (1994)
The Flintstones (1994)
Gremlins 2: The New Batch (1990)
RoboCop 2 (1990)
The 'Burbs (1989)
Innerspace (1987)
Airplane II: The Sequel (1982)
Tron (1982)
Airplane! (1980)
Carrie (1976)

References

External links

1944 births
People from Los Angeles County, California
Living people
American costume designers
Women costume designers